Mackinlaya is a genus of the flowering plant family Apiaceae (formerly placed in Araliaceae). Five species are known to science, growing naturally in Queensland, Australia, the Bismarck Archipelago, the Solomon Islands, New Guinea, Sulawesi and the Philippines.

References

External links
 Ecology : the Life Cycle of Mackinlaya confusa in the tropical rainforest (photo essay)

Mackinlayoideae
Apiaceae genera